Slovenia made its debut to the Eurovision Song Contest in 1993, having previously competed as part of Yugoslavia. The Slovene broadcaster Radiotelevizija Slovenija (RTVSLO) held a national final to select the first independent Slovene entry for the Eurovision Song Contest.

Before Eurovision

Slovenski izbor za Pesem Evrovizije 1993 
Slovenski izbor za Pesem Evrovizije 1993 took place on 27 February 1993 at the RTV Slovenija studios in Ljubljana, hosted by Tajda Lekše. A regional jury vote from twelve regions in Slovenia determined the winner.

At Kvalifikacija za Millstreet
Due to a major influx of countries wishing to enter the Eurovision Song Contest for the first time, due to the fall of communism, and the creation of new countries with the fall of the Soviet Union and disintegration of Yugoslavia, the European Broadcasting Union (EBU) were forced to limit the number of countries allowed to enter the contest. As such, a one-off contest was held to reduce the number of interested countries to just three that would progress to the contest, held in Millstreet, Ireland.

Kvalifikacija za Millstreet (Qualification for Millstreet) was held by RTVSLO in their TV studios in Ljubljana on 3 April 1993. Seven countries competed for the three spots in the final. Slovenia received 53 points, placing 1st in the contest and qualified to the final of the contest, along with former Yugoslav states Bosnia and Herzegovina and Croatia.

Voting

At Eurovision
At Millstreet, 1X Band performed 16th in the running order, following Luxembourg and preceding Finland. Slovenia received 9 points, placing 22nd in a field of 25. As such, Slovenia were forced to sit out the following contest due to new relegation rules which forced the lowest-placed countries to withdraw. Slovenia would return to Eurovision in 1995.

Voting

References

External links
Slovene National Final 1993

1993
Countries in the Eurovision Song Contest 1993
Eurovision